In mathematics, the dimension of a vector space V is the cardinality (i.e., the number of vectors) of a basis of V over its base field. It is sometimes called Hamel dimension (after Georg Hamel) or algebraic dimension to distinguish it from other types of dimension.

For every vector space there exists a basis, and all bases of a vector space have equal cardinality; as a result, the dimension of a vector space is uniquely defined.

When  can be inferred from context,  is typically written.

Examples 

The vector space  has

as a standard basis, and therefore  More generally,  and even more generally,  for any field  

The complex numbers  are both a real and complex vector space; we have  and  So the dimension depends on the base field.

The only vector space with dimension  is  the vector space consisting only of its zero element.

Properties 

If  is a linear subspace of  then 

The space  has the standard basis  where  is the -th column of the corresponding identity matrix. Therefore,  has dimension 

Any bijective map between their bases can be uniquely extended to a bijective linear map between the vector spaces.

An important result about dimensions is given by the rank–nullity theorem for linear maps.

If  is a field extension, then  is in particular a vector space over  Furthermore, every -vector space  is also a -vector space. The dimensions are related by the formula

In particular, every complex vector space of dimension  is a real vector space of dimension 

Some formulae relate the dimension of a vector space with the cardinality of the base field and the cardinality of the space itself.

If dim  is finite then 
If dim  is infinite then

Generalizations 

A vector space can be seen as a particular case of a matroid, and in the latter there is a well-defined notion of dimension. The length of a module and the rank of an abelian group both have several properties similar to the dimension of vector spaces.

The Krull dimension of a commutative ring, named after Wolfgang Krull (1899–1971), is defined to be the maximal number of strict inclusions in an increasing chain of prime ideals in the ring.

Trace 

The dimension of a vector space may alternatively be characterized as the trace of the identity operator. For instance, 
 
This appears to be a circular definition, but it allows useful generalizations.

Firstly, it allows for a definition of a notion of dimension when one has a trace but no natural sense of basis. For example, one may have an algebra  with maps  (the inclusion of scalars, called the unit) and a map  (corresponding to trace, called the counit). The composition  is a scalar (being a linear operator on a 1-dimensional space) corresponds to "trace of identity", and gives a notion of dimension for an abstract algebra. In practice, in bialgebras, this map is required to be the identity, which can be obtained by normalizing the counit by dividing by dimension, so in these cases the normalizing constant corresponds to dimension.

Alternatively, it may be possible to take the trace of operators on an infinite-dimensional space; in this case a (finite) trace is defined, even though no (finite) dimension exists, and gives a notion of "dimension of the operator". These fall under the rubric of "trace class operators" on a Hilbert space, or more generally nuclear operators on a Banach space.

A subtler generalization is to consider the trace of a family of operators as a kind of "twisted" dimension. This occurs significantly in representation theory, where the character of a representation is the trace of the representation, hence a scalar-valued function on a group  whose value on the identity  is the dimension of the representation, as a representation sends the identity in the group to the identity matrix:  The other values  of the character can be viewed as "twisted" dimensions, and find analogs or generalizations of statements about dimensions to statements about characters or representations. A sophisticated example of this occurs in the theory of monstrous moonshine: the -invariant is the graded dimension of an infinite-dimensional graded representation of the monster group, and replacing the dimension with the character gives the McKay–Thompson series for each element of the Monster group.

See also 

 
 
 
 
 , also called Lebesgue covering dimension

Notes

References

Sources

External links

 MIT Linear Algebra Lecture on Independence, Basis, and Dimension by Gilbert Strang at MIT OpenCourseWare

Dimension
Linear algebra
 
Vectors (mathematics and physics)